Band-Aid is a brand of adhesive bandages distributed by the American pharmaceutical and medical-devices company Johnson & Johnson. Invented in 1920, the brand has become a generic term for adhesive bandages in countries such as the United States, Canada, Australia, the Philippines, and others.

History
The Band-Aid was invented in 1920 by a Johnson & Johnson employee, Earle Dickson, in Highland Park, New Jersey, for his wife Josephine, who frequently cut and burned herself while cooking. The prototype allowed her to dress her wounds without assistance. Dickson passed the idea on to his employer, which went on to produce and market the product as the Band-Aid. Dickson had a successful career at Johnson & Johnson, rising to vice president before his retirement in 1957.

The original Band-Aids were handmade and not very popular. By 1924, Johnson & Johnson introduced machine-made Band-Aids and began the sale of sterilized Band-Aids in 1939.

In 1951, the first decorative Band-Aids were introduced. They continue to be a commercial success, with such themes as Mickey Mouse, Donald Duck, Superman, Spider-Man, Rocket Power, Rugrats, smiley faces, Barbie, Dora the Explorer, Elmo, and Batman.

In World War II, millions were shipped overseas, helping popularize the product. Since then, Johnson & Johnson has estimated a sale of over 100 billion Band-Aids worldwide.

In 2022, Band-Aid was named the most trusted brand in the United States, beating the second place brand, Lysol, by more than two points.

Trademark status
Band-Aid has, over time, become a well-known example of a genericized trademark in the United States, Canada and South America, but Johnson & Johnson has registered Band-Aid as a trademark on the Principal Register of the United States Patent and Trademark Office, and the registration is valid and legal. Johnson & Johnson continues to defend the Band-Aid trademark against it being genericized.

See also 
 Elastoplast, a comparable European brand and genericized trademark

References

External links

 Band-Aid Brand Official Website
 Band-Aid Brand History
 Johnson & Johnson First Aid Website 

Products introduced in 1920
First aid
Johnson & Johnson brands
Personal care brands
Brands that became generic